John F. Kennedy High School is a public four-year high school located in the Garfield Ridge neighborhood on the southwest side of  Chicago, Illinois, United States. Operated by Chicago Public Schools, Kennedy opened in 1963. The school is named in honor of the 35th President of the United States, John F. Kennedy (1917–1963). Kennedy is an Advancement Via Individual Determination (AVID) school. Since 2000, Kennedy has been a part of the International Baccalaureate Program.

History 
The school opened on October 3, 1963, as John H. Kinzie High School. The name was changed to the present one in 1965, to honor former President John F. Kennedy who was assassinated in the year of the school's founding.

Athletics 
Kennedy competes in the Chicago Public League (CPL) and is a member of the Illinois High School Association (IHSA). Kennedy varsity athletic teams are named the "Crusaders".  The boys' baseball team won City Championship in 1969, and were Class AA and Public League Champions in 1977–78. Kennedy boys' cross country were Class AA eight times (1976–77, 1978–79, 1979–80, 1992–93, and 1997–2001) and public league champions in 1997–98. The girls' bowling team were public league champions five times (1974–75, 1975–76, 1982–83, 1983–84, and 1987–88).

Fall: boys' soccer, girls' volleyball, football, cheerleading, boys' softball, girls' swimming, cross country
Winter: boys' basketball, girls' basketball, indoor track, bowling, cheerleading, boys' swimming, wrestling
Spring:  girls' Softball, boys' baseball, girls' soccer, boys' volleyball, track and field, water polo

Notable alumni 
Jim Hickey — Minor League Baseball player and Major League Baseball pitching coach 
Kathy Kelly – peace activist
Mark Protosevich – screenwriter
Jill Talley – comedic actress
Gene Walter – MLB player

References

External links
John F. Kennedy High School home page
Chicago Public Schools District home page

Public high schools in Chicago